Daniel Francis Noel O'Donnell, MBE (born 12 December 1961) is an Irish singer, television presenter and philanthropist. After rising to public attention in 1983, he has since become a household name in Ireland and Britain; he has also had considerable success in Australia. In 2012, he became the first artist to have a different album in the British charts every year for 25 consecutive years. This record has been extended and as of 2021, O'Donnell has had an album in the Official Albums Chart each year for the last 33 years.

Known for his close relationship with his fanbase, and his charismatic and engaging stage presence, O'Donnell's music has been described as a mix of country and Irish folk, and he has sold over ten million records to date. He is widely considered a "cultural icon" in Ireland, and is often parodied in the media. Affectionately known as "Wee Daniel", O'Donnell is a prominent ambassador for his home county of Donegal.

Early life
O'Donnell was born in and brought up in the village of Kincasslagh, in The Rosses district in the west of County Donegal, Ireland. He grew up as the youngest of a Roman Catholic family, with his parents, Julia (née McGonagle born 1919; died 18 May 2014) and Francis O'Donnell, and siblings John (the eldest), Margaret (Margo), Kathleen and James. He has described his upbringing as mostly happy, with the exception of the death of his father after a heart attack when O'Donnell was six years old.

During his school years, O'Donnell considered pursuing a career in banking. Despite this, a career in music was also always a possibility. As a youngster, O'Donnell performed in the local religious choir. In 1980, he went to Galway to pursue business studies, however, he never settled down and by Christmas he was in his sister Margo's band. Margo had already forged a successful career in Ireland.

Career

Rise to fame
Not getting enough opportunities to perform solos with the band, in 1983 O'Donnell decided to record his own record. On 9 February 1983, he recorded his first single, Johnny McCauley's "My Donegal Shore", with £1,200 of his own money, selling all the copies himself. Later that year, he formed his own musical group, Country Fever. After the group disbanded, he formed The Grassroots. In 1985, the manager of the Ritz label, Mick Clerkin, saw him perform and introduced him to Sean Reilly, who remains his manager to this day.

Under the management of Reilly, O'Donnell started to sell concerts out in England on a regular basis. According to O'Donnell, by January 1992, he had hit rock bottom with exhaustion. After a three-month recovery break, he returned to the stage, this time at the Point Theatre, Dublin.

Success
By the mid-1990s, O'Donnell had become a household name across Ireland and Great Britain. He appeared on popular television shows in both countries and won various awards. Among the accolades, O'Donnell was named Donegal Person of the Year in 1989, which he still rates as the best award. He was given the Irish Entertainer of the Year award in 1989, 1992 and 1996. O'Donnell's first chart hit single in the UK was in 1992 with "I Just Want to Dance With You" (later covered by George Strait). This also led to his first appearance on Top of the Pops.

During his lengthy career, O'Donnell has made friends with his childhood idols, including Cliff Richard and Loretta Lynn. He also forged a close professional relationship with the Irish songstress Mary Duff, who regularly tours with O'Donnell.

O’Donnell had to cancel a series of concerts in Northern Ireland because of death threats from loyalist paramilitaries in 1994. The threat was made in a phone call to Daniel O’Donnell's Viking House Hotel in Kincasslagh, County Donegal. The caller said O’Donnell would be killed if he went ahead with four sell-out concerts to be held in the Slieve Donard Hotel in Newcastle, County Down.

2000–present
In 2002, he was awarded an Honorary (because of his Irish citizenship) MBE for his services to the music industry. He has had twenty UK Top 40 albums as well as fifteen Top 40 singles and has sold 10 million records to date. O'Donnell garnered considerable success in North America, when he starred in seven concert specials on public television stations (PBS) in the United States. He has charted 18 albums in the Top 20 of the U.S. Billboard'''s World Music Album Chart and also has had several entries in the Independent Albums Chart too.
 He was afforded an RTÉ Christmas Day special, Daniel at 50, in 2011 to mark his 50th birthday.

In 2015, O'Donnell became the first artist to have charted at least one new album in the UK charts for 28 consecutive years (1988–2015), when his latest album The Hank Williams Songbook entered the UK Artist Albums Chart at number 5.

A Daniel O'Donnell Visitors' Centre was opened in Dungloe in May, 2012, which displays all his gold discs, awards and wedding suit.

In Autumn 2015, he appeared on Strictly Come Dancing. He was eliminated third; in week 4 of the series.

In October 2015, Daniel and his wife Majella starred in the first series of their TV programme Daniel and Majella's B&B Road Trip. That series aired on UTV but moved to RTÉ in 2016.

Personal life

O'Donnell was married, aged 40, on 4 November 2002, to 41-year-old divorcée Majella McLennan from Thurles, whom he met on holiday in Tenerife three years previously. McLennan received an annulment of her previous marriage, by which she had two children (Siobhan and Michael). The couple live in Meenbanad, County Donegal, and spend time at their second home in Tenerife.

O'Donnell also has two step-grandchildren - a step-granddaughter, Olivia, and a step-grandson, Archie, who are his wife's grandchildren.

Daniel is proficient in Irish and presented a show in that language for the broadcaster TG4.

Philanthropy

O'Donnell has been involved in many charitable causes for many years, most notably in Romania. He has championed the Romanian Challenge Appeal, a charity that helps orphaned Romanian children re-establish themselves within society. He was involved in urging Irish families to home these young people in Ireland for a period.

Image
O'Donnell is arguably better known for his gentle, soft-spoken personality and clean-cut image, than for his music. Over the years he has attracted vast media attention and there have been many cultural references to the performer. O'Donnell is frequently satirised in Irish and British comedy because of a common supposition that his audience consists mainly of older women. He was parodied as celebrity singer "Eoin McLove" in the Father Ted episode "Night of the Nearly Dead", as well as an episode of BBC sketch-show Chewin' the Fat, as an Irish singer named "Donald O'Daniel". The comedy show Bull Island and the radio sketch segment "Gift Grub" portrayed him in sketches frequently singing about his "mammy". DJ Chris Moyles has parodied O'Donnell on numerous occasions.

O'Donnell is known for his close relationship with his fans and has a meet-and-greet session after almost every concert. He used to host a massive tea party for his fans outside his Donegal home every year. He has expressed a wish to appear in Coronation Street.

He appeared on Martin and Paul's Surf 'n' Turf.

Discography
 Studio albums 

 Live albums 

 Charting compilation albums 

Extended plays

Singles

Awards and honours
 1988 – RTÉ Guide Favourite Country Artist of the Year 1989 – RTÉ Guide Favourite Country Artist of the Year 1989 – Donegal Person of the Year 1989 – IRMA Entertainer of the Year 1990 – RTÉ Guide Favourite Country Artist of the Year 1991 – RTÉ Guide Favourite Country Artist of the Year 1991 – British Country Music Awards International Artist of the Year 1991 – CMRU Most Popular British Vocalist 1991 – IRMA Entertainer of the Year 1992 – IRMA Entertainer of the Year 1992 – RTÉ Guide Favourite Country Artist of the Year 1992 – British Country Music Awards International Artist of the Year 1992 – CMRU Most Popular British Vocalist 1995 – British Country Music Awards International Artist of the Year 1997 – British Country Music Awards Ambassador Award for Outstanding Services to Country Music 2000 – This Is Your Life Tribute
 2002 – Awarded an Honorary MBE for services to the music industry and charity
 2004 – Lifetime Achievement Award from The Irish Post 2011 – Lifetime Achievement Award from the Sunday World''

See also
 List of baritones in non-classical music
 Music of Ireland
 Country and Irish

References

External links
 Official website
 Original website
 
 story covering O'Donnell's honorary MBE at the BBC
 Interview with Daniel on ITV Yorkshire, 20 October 2008
 Interview on Loose Women with Daniel and his wife in 2016

1961 births
20th-century Irish male singers
Living people
Irish country singers
Irish folk singers
20th-century Irish philanthropists
Irish tenors
Members of the Order of the British Empire
People from County Donegal
Musicians from County Donegal
Telstar Records artists
21st-century Irish philanthropists